Bright Igbinadolor (born 16 December 1980) is a Nigerian international footballer who plays professionally in Myanmar for Southern Myanmar United, as a midfielder.

Career
Igbinadolor has played professionally in Nigeria, Spain, Switzerland, Finland and Myanmar for Bendel Insurance, Sporting de Gijón B, Stade Nyonnais, Jokerit and Southern Myanmar United.

He participated at the 2000 Summer Olympics, and earned one senior cap for Nigeria in 2002.

References

1980 births
Living people
Nigerian footballers
Nigeria international footballers
Nigerian expatriate footballers
Olympic footballers of Nigeria
Footballers at the 2000 Summer Olympics
Expatriate footballers in Myanmar
Expatriate footballers in Spain
Expatriate footballers in Switzerland
Expatriate footballers in Finland
Nigerian expatriate sportspeople in Spain
Nigerian expatriate sportspeople in Switzerland
Nigerian expatriate sportspeople in Finland
Veikkausliiga players
Bendel Insurance F.C. players
Sporting de Gijón B players
FC Stade Nyonnais players
FC Jokerit players
Association football midfielders
Southern Myanmar F.C. players